Sports in Brazil are those that are widely practiced and popular in the country, as well as others which originated there or have some cultural significance. Brazilians are heavily involved in sports. Football is the most popular sport in Brazil. Other than football, sports like volleyball, mixed martial arts, basketball, tennis, and motor sports, especially Formula One, enjoy high levels of popularity.

Sports

Football

Football is the most popular sport in Brazil. The Brazil national football team, governed by the Confederação Brasileira de Futebol, has won the FIFA World Cup a record 5 times, in 1958, 1962, 1970, 1994, and 2002, and is the only team to succeed in qualifying for every FIFA World Cup competition ever held. Brazil also hosted the 1950 and 2014 World Cups, becoming the only country in South America to have hosted two World Cups (Argentina, Uruguay, and Chile being the other former hosts). It is among the favorites to win the trophy every time the competition is scheduled. After Brazil won its third World Cup in 1970, they were awarded the Jules Rimet Trophy, when Pelé, one of the most recognized football players in history and all-time top scorer in the sport, led Brazil to three of those championships. The national football team has also won the Copa América 9 times, the Olympic football tournament twice and is the most successful team in the FIFA Confederations Cup, with 4 titles. All of the leading players in the national teams are prominent in the football world, including Pelé, Zico, Garrincha, Ronaldo, Roberto Carlos, Romário, Ronaldinho, Taffarel, Falcão, Rivaldo and Neymar in the men's game, and Marta in the women's game. Some of these players can be considered super-stars, achieving celebrity status internationally and signing multi-million club contracts, as well as advertisement and endorsement deals.

Footvolley
Footvolley was created by Octavio de Moraes in the 1970s. It is a mix of football and volleyball, where the players must use their feet and head to get the ball over the net and into the opponent's side, and is played on the beaches. It is one of the most popular beach sports in Brazil. Footvolley started out with 5 players on each team but later got cut to 2 players on each team and is still so to this day.

Capoeira
Capoeira is an Afro-Brazilian martial art that combines elements of dance and music, and is marked by deft, tricky movements that are often played on the ground or completely inverted. It also has a strong acrobatic component in some versions and is always played with music. It is a culturally significant sport, developed in colonial times by slaves. Nowadays, capoeira is practiced internationally and found its way into popular culture, through many computer games and movies.

Brazilian jiu-jitsu, vale tudo, and mixed martial arts

Mixed martial arts is one of the most popular sports in Brazil. It is considered to be only behind football in terms in national popularity.

Brazilian jiu-jitsu originated in Brazil in the 1910s, and emphasizes ground fighting techniques and submission holds involving joint-locks and chokeholds. Hélio Gracie had a rather small build and changed jiu-jitsu (originating from Japan) to be used by anyone in a real fight situation. The belt progression system goes in the following order: White, Blue, Purple, Brown, Black, Red-black, and Red. Gracie Jiu Jitsu became known internationally in the 1990s, due to the very skilled fighters in the Gracie family, namely Hélio Gracie, Royce Gracie, and Rickson Gracie, which are also responsible for spreading the practice of vale tudo, meaning "anything goes", which evolved into mixed martial arts tournaments such as PRIDE, DREAM, and the Ultimate Fighting Championship. Many Brazilian fighters have become significant figures in various mixed martial art tournaments abroad, some notable Brazilian fighters in these tournaments include Anderson Silva, Wanderlei Silva, Antônio Rodrigo Nogueira, Vitor Belfort, Mauricio Rua, José Aldo, Murilo Bustamante, Junior dos Santos, Rafael dos Anjos, Fabricio Werdum, and Lyoto Machida.

Volleyball

Brazil is the most successful country in volleyball.

The Brazil men's national volleyball team is currently the champion in 3 competitions, the Volleyball World Cup, the Volleyball World Championship and the Olympic Volleyball Tournament, and is ranked number 1 in the FIVB World Rankings.

Here is a record for achievements of the Brazilian men's volleyball team:
Olympics:
 (1992, 2004, 2016)

 (1984, 2008, 2012)
World Championship:
 (2002, 2006, 2010)
World Cup:
 (2003, 2007, 2019)
FIVB World League:
 (1993, 2001, 2003, 2004, 2005, 2006, 2007, 2009, 2010)
FIVB Volleyball Men's Nations League:
 (2021)
Volleyball Grand Champions Cup:
 (1997, 2005, 2009, 2013, 2017)

The Brazil women's national volleyball team is ranked number 4 in the FIVB World Rankings.

Here is a record for achievements of the Brazilian women's volleyball team:
Olympics:
 (2008, 2012)

 (2020)

 (1996, 2000)
World Championship:
 (1994, 2006, 2010, 2022)
FIVB World Grand Prix:
 (1994, 1996, 1998, 2004, 2005, 2006, 2008, 2009, 2013, 2014, 2017)
FIVB Volleyball Women's Nations League:
 (2019, 2021, 2022)
Volleyball Grand Champions Cup:
 (2005, 2013)

Brazilian younger teams maintain the same success rate as the senior squads. As of March 25, 2007, in the FIVB men ranking for junior and youth, Brazil is placed first for women, while the men are placed second.

Beach volleyball has also given Brazilian athletes much success worldwide. Today, Brazil is the ruling country in volleyball, and it is Brazil's second most popular sport. The FIVB 2006 World Tour has finished with Brazilians on the top in both men and women rankings. Both, men and women, have won Olympic Games medals. Men have won gold in 2004 and 2016, and silver 2000 and 2008; and women have won golden in 1996, silver in 1996, 2000, and 2004, and bronze in 1996 and 2000. Brazilian athletes have also collected many medals in the World Tour.

Brazil has professional volleyball team competitions: the Superliga Masculina de Vôlei and its female counterpart, Superliga Feminina de Vôlei. Among the most successful teams are Minas, Banespa, and Santo André for the male league, and Rexona, Osasco, and Flamengo for the female league.

Basketball

Basketball is the third most popular sport in Brazil. The Brazilian national basketball team has won the Basketball World Championship twice, in 1959 and 1963. They have also been runners-up on two occasions in 1954 and 1970, as well as coming third on two occasions in 1967 and 1978, meaning that the Brazilian national basketball team has won in total six medals at the Basketball World Championship. The Brazilian national basketball team has also won three Olympic bronze medals (1948, 1960, 1964) and total of nine medals at the FIBA Americas Championship, three gold (1984, 2005, 2009) two silver (1988, 2001), and four bronze (1989, 1992, 1995, 1997). Oscar Schmidt is the most renowned male Brazilian player, and Hortência Marcari the most renowned female. Both were inducted to the Naismith Memorial Basketball Hall of Fame and the FIBA Hall of Fame.

The major basketball leagues are called Novo Basquete Brasil – the men's tournament – and Liga de Basquete Feminino – the female tournament. Various famous Brazilian players play in those leagues. In addition, on the men's side, various players are competing in the National Basketball Association and European leagues. A record nine Brazilians were on NBA rosters at the start of the —Leandro Barbosa, Bruno Caboclo, Cristiano Felício, Marcelo Huertas, Nenê, Raul Neto, Lucas Nogueira, Tiago Splitter, and Anderson Varejão. On the women's side, players like Izi Castro Marques and Érika de Souza compete in the WNBA.

Motorsport

Brazil has produced three Formula One world champions: Emerson Fittipaldi ( and ), Nelson Piquet (and ), and Ayrton Senna (and ). In total, Brazilian drivers have won 101 Formula One races (as of the 2009 Italian Grand Prix), distributed between Senna (41), Piquet (23), Fittipaldi (14), Felipe Massa (11), Rubens Barrichello (11), and José Carlos Pace (1).

In , Brazil declared three days of national mourning after Senna's death during the 1994 San Marino Grand Prix. 

As of the  season, Massa is the last Brazilian driver to have competed full-time in Formula One.

The Brazilian Grand Prix has been on the Formula One calendar since , currently held in October or November. Two circuits have been host to the race: Jacarepagua and Interlagos. The Jacarepagua circuit, located in Rio de Janeiro, hosted the 1978 race, and then between 1981 and 1989. From 1972 to 1977, in 1979 and 1980, and from 1990 to the present, the Grand Prix has been held at the Interlagos circuit in São Paulo.

One Formula One team has been based in Brazil: Fittipaldi Automotive, owned by Emerson Fittipaldi and his brother Wilson. The team competed from 1974 to 1982.

Brazil has produced several notable drivers in American open-wheel car racing, some of whom also competed in Formula One. Emerson Fittipaldi was the 1989 CART champion, Gil de Ferran was the 2000 CART and 2001 CART champion, Cristiano da Matta was the 2002 CART champion and the Tony Kanaan was 2004 IndyCar Series champion. Brazilian drivers have won the Indianapolis 500, the most prestigious race in American open-wheel racing, eight times: Emerson Fittipaldi in 1989 and 1993; Hélio Castroneves in 2001, 2002, 2009 and 2021; Gil de Ferran in 2003; and Tony Kanaan in 2013. Castroneves is one of only four drivers two have won the Indianapolis 500 four times, and the only one from a country other than the United States. Two American open-wheel races have been held in Brazil: CART hosted the Rio 400 (later the Rio 200) at Jacarepagua from 1996 to 2000, and the IndyCar Series hosted the São Paulo Indy 300 from 2010 to 2013.

In the sports car racing scene, Raul Boesel won the 1987 World Sportscar Championship and got close to winning the 1991 Le Mans 24 Hours, when he was second, and Ricardo Zonta won the 1998 FIA GT Championship. Boesel was part of the winning team at the 1988 Daytona 24 Hours, a race which was also won by fellow Brazilians Christian Fittipaldi (twice, in 2004 and 2014), Oswaldo Negri (2012), Kanaan (2015) and Pipo Derani (2016). Fittipaldi also won the United SportsCar Championship in 2014 and 2015, alongside Portuguese team-mate João Barbosa. Also the Mil Milhas Brasil, an endurance race, has the longest history in the Brazilian racing events.

Nelson Piquet Jr. was the inaugural Formula E champion in 2014-15 and Lucas Di Grassi won 2016-17 with Audi Abt Sportsline .

The popularity of auto racing is rising, with the Stock Car Brasil and Fórmula Truck being broadcast nationally. The South American Formula Three series was mostly held in Brazil until 2013, and developed several South American circuit drivers. In 2014 it was succeeded by a revived Brazilian Formula Three Championship.

In motorcycle racing, the most prominent Brazilian racer in MotoGP as of now is Alex Barros, who is the most experienced racer of all time in the category, with 276 race starts and seven wins. The Brazilian motorcycle Grand Prix was held four times between 1987 and 1992, followed by the Rio de Janeiro motorcycle Grand Prix which was held nine times between 1995 and 2004.

Tennis

Maria Esther Bueno is the most successful Brazilian tennis player at the Grand Slam tournaments. She won seven single titles (four wins at the US Open and three at Wimbledon) and twelve doubles titles (five at Wimbledon, four at the US Open, two in the Roland Garros, including a mixed doubles title). In the men's game, Gustavo Kuerten is the most successful Brazilian player, with three wins at Roland Garros (1997, 2000, 2001) as well as being ranked number one in the world for almost a full year. However, bad administration and lack of serious support resulted in poor results in the present years and scarcity of national-level competitiveness. Beatriz Haddad Maia is the first Brazilian woman to enter the world's top 20 in the Open Era.

Brazil has also had other historically important players, such as Luiz Mattar, Fernando Meligeni and Thomaz Bellucci, who were already top 30 in the ATP rankings.

In the country, Doubles has been stronger, especially with Marcelo Melo, Bruno Soares and Luisa Stefani. Melo has been ranked No. 1 in the ATP Doubles Rankings and Soares has achieved a peak ranking of No. 2. Stefani was the first Brazilian woman to reach the world's top 10 in the Open Era. Melo won his first Grand Slam title in Roland Garros and his second in Wimbledon. He has also reached at least the semifinals of all four Grand Slams, has won 9 Masters 1000 titles and reached the doubles final on the ATP World Tour Finals. In 2009, he reached the mixed doubles final at the French Open with American Vania King, becoming the seventh Brazilian to reach the final of a Grand Slam and the first since Gustavo Kuerten. Soares won the 2016 Australian Open and US Open Men's Doubles with Jamie Murray, 2020 US Open Men's Doubles with Mate Pavić, the US Open Mixed Doubles title in 2012 (with Ekaterina Makarova) and 2014 (with Sania Mirza), and the 2016 Australian Open Mixed Doubles with Elena Vesnina. He also has 4 Masters 1000 titles (a double championship at Canada's Masters 1000 in 2013 and 2014, the Cincinnati Masters 1000 in 2018 and the Shanghai Masters 1000 in 2019).

Swimming

Swimming is very popular in Brazil. Being a sport usually recommended for children, and suitable for a country with a tropical climate like Brazil, swimming has grown and started to produce important sporting icons. Although the country had some success with swimmers like Piedade Coutinho, Tetsuo Okamoto, Manuel dos Santos and José Fiolo, the sport started to become more popular with Djan Madruga, Rômulo Arantes and Ricardo Prado in 1970s and 1980s; going through Gustavo Borges and Fernando Scherer in the 1990s, Brazilian swimming today manufactures great talents in succession.

Today Brazil has one of the best swimmers in the world, César Cielo, who is an Olympic champion, world champion and world record holder; olympic medalists like Thiago Pereira, Bruno Fratus and Fernando Scheffer; swimmers like Felipe França and Kaio de Almeida who managed to beat world records in their events, as well as medalists in World Championships, such as Nicholas Santos, João Gomes Júnior, Felipe Lima and Guilherme Costa. Even female swimming has been developing and creating athletes like Etiene Medeiros and Ana Marcela Cunha. With the multiplication of the emergence of talents, swimming has been standing out and conquering its space.

Athletics

Athletics is a traditional sport in Brazil, winning Olympic medals for the country. In athletics, the best known athletes are Adhemar Ferreira da Silva, João Carlos de Oliveira, Joaquim Cruz, Robson Caetano, Maurren Maggi and Fabiana Murer. Other important athletes in the history of Brazil are: Thiago Braz, Alison dos Santos, Nélson Prudêncio, Jadel Gregório, Zequinha Barbosa, Sanderlei Parrela, Claudinei Quirino , Vicente de Lima, André Domingos, Édson Ribeiro, Vanderlei Cordeiro de Lima, Caio Bonfim, Rosângela Santos, Letícia Oro Melo, Mauro Vinícius da Silva and Darlan Romani.

In Brazil, athletics tends to lose many practitioners to football, who grant better salaries to athletes. It's one of the reasons why the country has less global prominence in events such as the 100 metres. The sport is usually concentrated in some clubs specializing in athletics, and also receives attention and support from the country's Armed Forces. Brazil has a tradition in events such as triple jump and hosts important long-distance running events, such as Saint Silvester Road Race.

Judo

Judo is another sport usually recommended for children in Brazil, and therefore it is widely practiced. The country has a growing international tradition in the sport, constantly winning medals and titles. The sport was brought and developed by its large Japanese community. The greatest exponents of the sport until today were Aurélio Miguel, Sarah Menezes and Rogério Sampaio, Olympic champions. Brazil also had several other important judô athletes, such as the Olympic runners-up Douglas Vieira, Tiago Camilo, Carlos Honorato, and the Olympic bronze medalists Chiaki Ishii, Luiz Onmura, Walter Carmona, Henrique Guimarães, Leandro Guilheiro, Flávio Canto, Ketleyn Quadros, Felipe Kitadai, Mayra Aguiar, Daniel Cargnin and Rafael Silva.

American football

American football is played by young people in some states. The most popular varieties are flag football (especially in São Paulo) and beach American football (played in coastal cities such as Rio de Janeiro, Recife and João Pessoa).

Also, the sport is already one of the most played around the country, with approximately 130 teams.

Handball

Handball is a sport that came with German immigrants, which is very popular in schools around the world. It's the second most practiced sport in schools in Brazil, second only to football / futsal. The national team is considered the best in South America, and the sport is gaining in media coverage. Brazil women's national handball team were crowned world champions for the first time at the 2013 Championship.

Beach handball
At the Beach Handball World Championships Brazil has more titles for both genders than any country.

Boxing

Boxing is another popular sport, especially in Northeast Brazil; it's considered a sport of the working class. Eder Jofre and Acelino Popó Freitas are former world champions. In the Olympics, Brazil won the gold medal in the category of up to 60 kg with the fighter Robson Conceição, being the first Olympic gold in Brazilian boxing. Hebert Conceição was also an Olympic champion. Other Olympic medalists in Brazil were Servílio de Oliveira, Yamaguchi Falcão, Esquiva Falcão, Abner Teixeira, Adriana Araújo and Beatriz Ferreira. Another famous boxer in Brazil was Maguila, a heavyweight who came to face Evander Holyfield and George Foreman.

Skateboarding

Skateboarding is a popular sport in Brazil. According to a study of 2019, the estimated number of skateboarders in Brazil was close to 8.5 million (the majority in the state of São Paulo). Many of the world's top skateboarders are Brazilian, including Bob Burnquist, Sandro Dias, Lincoln Ueda, Rodrigo Menezes, Luan de Oliveira, Felipe Gustavo, Rodil Ferrugem, Nilton Neves, Fabrizio Santos, Alex Carolino, Christiano Mateus, Karen Jones, Ricardo Porva, Daniel Vieira, and Og de Souza. Fabiola da Silva is well known for aggressive inline skating.

With the rise of skateboarding to the category of Olympic sport in 2020, Rayssa Leal became famous for her silver medal obtained at the age of 13. Pedro Barros and Kelvin Hoefler also won Olympic medals. Other famous skaters like Pâmela Rosa and Letícia Bufoni also stand out.

Surfing

Surfing is one of the most popular aquatic sports in Brazil, with several professional Brazilian surfers competing in the men's and women's ASP World Tour, including former world champions Gabriel Medina and Adriano de Souza. Brazil is known for producing longboard surfers (such as former world champion Phil Razjman), big-rider surfers (such as Carlos Burle and two-time XXL award winner Maya Gabeira) and well-known bodyboarders.

Brazilian surfing has progressively evolved to become one of the biggest forces in the sport in the world. Fábio Gouveia reached number 5 in the world in 1992. In the 2010s, the Brazilian Storm appears, with several Brazilians getting closer and closer to the world title, until Gabriel Medina conquers the same in 2014 and Adriano de Souza wins in 2015. In 2020 surfing ascends to the category of Olympic sport and Ítalo Ferreira becomes Olympic champion.

Chess

Chess is a sport with many fans in Brazil. Henrique Mecking, known as Mequinho, is considered the most important Brazilian chess player, having reached his peak in 1977, when he was considered the third best player in the world, surpassed only by Anatoly Karpov and Viktor Korchnoi. More recently, in an online blitz game played in May 2020, Luis Paulo Supi defeated reigning World Champion Magnus Carlsen in 18 moves after sacrificing his own Queen. The match received worldwide attention as Carlsen broadcast it live, and was left speechless after his defeat. In April 2021, Chess.com awarded that game the first spot in their Chess.com Immortal Game Contest.

Rugby union

Rugby has been played in Brazil since at least 1888. Although it has been played in Brazil for as long as football, it has never enjoyed its popularity, it's also mostly played amateurly. The Brazil national rugby union team has so far never qualified for a Rugby World Cup, it did secured the South American Rugby Championship for the first time in 2018 and in November the national team had an historical friendly with the Māori All Blacks. A domestic club competition, the Campeonato Brasileiro de Rugby, has been contested annually since 1964.
Rugby returned to the Olympics in Rio 2016 (in the 7-a-side tournament form) - see Rugby sevens at the 2016 Summer Olympics.
As 2016 Olympic hosts, Brazil men's and women's teams automatically qualified.

The sport is not widely played in schools, but is common in universities. All 27 states were reported to have rugby clubs, but around 50% of the active clubs are located in the São Paulo state. As of 2016, rugby was played by about 60,000 Brazilians and has experienced sizeable growth in the country.

Rugby league 

Rugby league has been played in Brazil in the 2010s, and has developed a small but growing domestic presence. The Brazilian national team will compete in the 2022 South American Rugby League Championship, their first major international tournament, which is part of the qualifying process for the 2025 World Cup.

The Brazil women's national rugby league team was successful in qualifying for and participated in the 2021 Women's World Cup.

Baseball

Baseball is traditionally practiced mostly by the Japanese communities in Brazil. It is not very popular in the country, but with the cable TV coverage of the games, baseball is also gaining fans among non-nisseis. There are several regional leagues on the rise in the country, however, the difficulty in finding baseball fields prevents regular practice of the sport that is often played on adapted football fields.

The National team appeared in the 2013 World Baseball Classic. Paulo Orlando and Yan Gomes are the only Brazilians to win the World Series.

Hockey
In Brazil, roller in-line hockey is the most popular form of hockey, unlike ice hockey that is still dependent on infrastructure. Brazilians that practices hockey, mostly practices the roller in-line hockey.

The main world championships of Ice Hockey are transmitted through cable TV in the country, among them the NHL played between teams of Canada and the United States, and the European League. Despite this, the modality finds difficulties in falling in the popular taste of the country.

Other sports in Brazil

Skateboarding is a popular sport in Brazil. According to a study conducted by Datafolha, the estimated number of skateboarders in Brazil for 2003 was close to three million (the majority in the state of São Paulo). Many of the world's top skateboarders are Brazilian, including Bob Burnquist, Sandro Dias, Pedro Barros, Lincoln Ueda, Rodrigo Menezes, Luan de Oliveira, Felipe Gustavo, Rodil Ferrugem, Nilton Neves, Fabrizio Santos, Alex Carolino, Christiano Mateus, Karen Jones, Ricardo Porva, Daniel Vieira, and Og de Souza. Fabiola da Silva is well known for aggressive inline skating.

Judo and sailing are traditional sports in Brazil which have earned Olympic medals for the country. 

Sailing and equestrianism are spectator sports, inaccessible to the general population. Well-known athletes include rider Rodrigo Pessoa and sailors Robert Scheidt, Martine Grael, Kahena Kunze, brothers Lars and Torben Grael, and Marcelo Ferreira. Robert Scheidt in particular is considered one of the greatest Olympic athletes in the Sailing competition, and one of the best sailors of all time in his class.

In horse racing, Silvestre de Sousa was the British flat racing Champion Jockey in 2015. The Brazilian-bred horse Glória de Campeão won the Dubai World Cup, then the world's richest Thoroughbred race, in 2010 with Brazilian jockey T. J. Pereira aboard.

Curling is a growing sport in Brazil; the creation of a national team was inspired by the audience for the 2010 Winter Olympics in Vancouver. A temporary rink in the Eldorado Shopping Center in São Paulo featured Norwegian curler Linn Githmark and a winter-sports complex is planned, probably in the city of Campos do Jordão.

 is a native Brazilian sport similar to tennis and cricket, played with a wooden racket and soft rubber ball on the beach with no scoring system. It began during the 1960s on Ipanema beach. Biribol is another native sport created in Birigüi, São Paulo state. It is a kind of volleyball played in a swimming pool. Peteca (shuttlecock) is a native sport which originated from indigenous games.

Surfing is one of the most popular aquatic sports in Brazil, with several professional Brazilian surfers competing in the men's and women's ASP World Tour, including former world champions Gabriel Medina and Adriano de Souza. Brazil is known for producing longboard surfers (such as former world champion Phil Razjman), big-rider surfers (such as Carlos Burle and two-time XXL award winner Maya Gabeira) and well-known bodyboarders.

Rodeo enjoys significant popularity in some rural regions of southern states. The rodeo event of bull riding has become a significant niche sport on its own since the success of Adriano Moraes on the US-based Professional Bull Riders (PBR) circuit in the 1990s and 2000s. PBR now runs a national touring series in Brazil, and Brazilian riders are heavily represented on the main PBR circuit in the US.

Cricket has a burgeoning Brazilian women's national team, who won the 2018 South American Women's Cricket Championship. See Cricket in Brazil.

Brazil at the Olympics

Due to the tropical and subtropical nature of the climate of Brazil, it has not traditionally competed in the Winter Olympics, although it made its first appearance in the 1992 Winter Olympics, and most recently participated in the 2014 Winter Olympics. However, Brazil has been competing in the Summer Olympics since 1920. Brazil is currently ranked 33rd in the overall ranking of medals in the Summer Olympics. Rio de Janeiro hosted the 2016 Summer Olympics, the first Olympic Games held in South America.

Sports in media

On television, football is by far the most watched sport on both free and paid television, games from regional teams often guarantee the top audience in its cities, also European football (especially UEFA Champions League) are guaranteed high viewing figures.

In motorsport, the main national competitions are Stock Car Brasil and Fórmula Truck. Formula One is considered the second most watched sport in terms of TV audience, behind football. The IndyCar Series also has a good fanbase in Brazil.

MMA in a short period of time has become the second most broadcast sport on Brazilian TV, due mainly to the resounding success of Brazilian fighters in the UFC.

Both men and women's volleyball enjoy very good viewing figures, especially the Brazilian national volleyball teams, Superliga and beach volleyball matches.

Basketball is also widely broadcast, prominently the national league (NBB), the NBA and FIBA. Basketball's level of popularity is returning to its historical levels.

In recent years, American football has been gaining fast popularity, with NFL games guaranteeing an audience on ESPN Brasil and Esporte Interativo. Also, some Torneio Touchdown (Brazilian League) games are shown by BandSports. In 2016, the two main leagues merged into the Superliga Nacional.

Curling was the latest sporting phenomenon in Brazil in terms of audience. During the 2013 World Women's Curling Championship, held in late March in Canada, about 3.6 million people watched the channel SporTV, leading audiences among sports channels on pay TV. The audience was even greater during the men's worlds that year.

Gallery

See also

 Sport in South America
 Button Football

References

External links
 Brazilian most visited sports websites:
 Globo Esporte
 Lancenet
 Gazeta Esportiva
 UOL Esporte
 Terra Esportes
 Yahoo/Esporte Interativo